Australia competed at the 1994 Winter Olympics in Lillehammer, Norway.

Australia won a bronze medal in the men's 5000 metres short track relay, the nation's first medal at the Winter Olympic Games. A total of 25 Australian athletes competed, participating in alpine skiing, biathlon, bobsleigh, cross-country skiing, figure skating, freestyle skiing (in both aerials and moguls), luge, short track speed skating, and speed skating.

Medalists

Alpine skiing

Men

Women

Biathlon

Women

Bobsleigh

Cross-country skiing

Men

Figure skating

Freestyle skiing

Men

Women

Luge

Short track speed skating

The relay result was Australia's first Winter Olympics medal. In the semi-final, they beat Japan and New Zealand to qualify behind Canada. They went into the final with three objectives: to stay on their feet (to avoid a repeat of what happened in Albertville), to remain undisqualified, and to beat at least one of the other three finalists. With 21 of 45 laps to go, a Canadian crashed into the side, and was out of contention. With 12 laps to go, Italian Mirko Vuillermin accelerated away, creating a gap such that Australia was unlikely to win gold. Until the last change, it seemed that Australia might win silver. Nizielski was the final skater, and said later that "At the last change [American] Eric Flaim got a good push-away and he stepped underneath my feet and stopped me. I thought, well I'm not going to fight him for this. I didn't want to let the team down. And I was very aware that I had taken a fall in Albertville. I just wanted to get through and get the medal." Team member Steven Bradbury went on to win Australia's first winter gold in 2002.

Men

Women

Speed skating

Men

References

External links 

Australia NOC
Olympic Winter Institute of Australia
"2002 Australian Winter Olympic Team Guide" PDF file
"The Compendium: Official Australian Olympic Statistics 1896-2002" Australian Olympic Committee  (Inconsistencies in sources mentioned in Wikibooks:Errata/0702234257)
"Australia and the Olympic Games" by Harry Gordon. 
 Australian Olympic Committee

Nations at the 1994 Winter Olympics
1994
Winter sports in Australia
1994 in Australian sport